Châteauneuf or Châteauneuf-en-Auxois is a commune in the Côte-d'Or department in eastern France.

Population

Sights
Châteauneuf is dominated by its château, which was given in December 1456 by Philip the Good to Philippe Pot, whose renovations and fortification gave to it the aspect it retains today, with the arms of Pol and his orders of the Golden Fleece and of Saint-Michel. The medieval bourg that surrounds it is a member of the Les Plus Beaux Villages de France ("The most beautiful villages of France") association.

See also
 Château de Châteauneuf

References

Communes of Côte-d'Or
Plus Beaux Villages de France
Côte-d'Or communes articles needing translation from French Wikipedia